April 3 - Eastern Orthodox liturgical calendar - April 5

All fixed commemorations below are observed on April 17 by Eastern Orthodox Churches on the Old Calendar.

For April 4th, Orthodox Churches on the Old Calendar commemorate the Saints listed on March 22.

Saints

 Martyrs Agathopodes, a deacon, and Theodulus, a lector, at Thessalonica, under Maximian (c. 286–305) (see also: April 5 - Slavic)
 Virgin-martyr Pherbutha (Phermoutha, Ferfouthe) of Persia, with her sister and her servants (343)
 Venerable George of Mount Maleon (Malevon) in Laconia, monk, in the Peloponnese (5th-6th centuries)
 Venerable Publius the Egyptian.  (see also: April 5 - Slavic)
 Venerable Zosimas of Palestine, Hieromonk (c. 560)
 Venerable Saints Theonas, Symeon, and Fervinus (Phorbinus).  (see also: April 5 - Slavic)
 Venerable Platon the Studite (Plato of Sakkoudion), Abbot of the Studion and Confessor (812)  (see also: April 5 - Slavic)
 Venerable Joseph the Hymnographer, of Sicily (883)  (see also: April 3 - Greek)

Pre-Schism Western saints

 Saint Guier, a priest and hermit in Cornwall, where a church recalls his name.
 Saint Gwerir, a hermit near Liskeard in Cornwall, at whose grave King Alfred was healed of a serious illness.
 Saint Tigernach of Clones (Tigernake, Tierney, Tierry), Abbot of Clones, succeeded St Macartin as bishop at Clogher in Ireland (549)
 Saint Isidore of Seville, Bishop of Seville (636)
 Saint Hildebert of Ghent, Abbot of Saint Peter's Abbey, Ghent, Belgium, martyred by fanatics for defending the veneration of icons (752)

Post-Schism Orthodox saints

 Venerable Joseph the Much-ailing, of the Kiev Caves (14th century)
 Venerable James, monk of Starotorzhok (Old Torzhok) in Galich, Kostroma (15th-16th centuries)
 Venerable Theonas, Metropolitan of Thessaloniki (1541)
 Venerable Zosimas, founder and abbot of the Annunciation Monastery at Lake Vorbozoma (Vorbosomsk) (1550)
 New Hieromartyr Nicetas the Albanian, of Mount Athos and Serres (1808)
 Venerable Elias of Makeyevka, Schema-monk, of Makeyevka, Ukraine (1949)

New martyrs and confessors

 New Hieromartyr Benjamin (Kononov), Archimandrite, of Solovki Monastery (1928)
 New Hieromartyr Nicephorus (Kuchin), Hieromonk, of Solovki Monastery (1928)
 New Hieromartyr Nicholas (Karaulov), Bishop of Velsk (1932)
 New Nun-martyr Maria (Lelyanova) of Gatchina (1932) (see also: January 26)
 New Hieromartyr John Vechorko, Priest (1933)
 Martyr John Kolesnikov (1943)

Other commemorations

 Icon of the Most Holy Theotokos "The Life-giving Spring" (450)  (see also: Bright Friday)
 The Akathist Hymn (Chairetismoi) to the Virgin Mary (626)
 Icon of the Most Holy Theotokos "Gerontissa" ("Eldress"), at Pantokratoros monastery, Mount Athos.
 The Icon of the Mother of God "Deliverer" ("Deliveress") (1841, 1889)  (see also: October 17)
 Repose of Elder Savvas of Little St. Anne's Skete, Mt. Athos (1908)
 Repose of Maria Berushko and 8 children, by fire, in Joaquim Távora, Brazil
 Repose of Archimandrite John (Maitland Moir) of Edinburgh, Scotland (April 17, 2013)

Icon gallery

Notes

References

Sources
 April 4 / April 17. Orthodox Calendar (pravoslavie.ru).
 April 17 / April 4. Holy Trinity Russian Orthodox Church (A parish of the Patriarchate of Moscow).
 April 4. OCA - The Lives of the Saints.
 The Autonomous Orthodox Metropolia of Western Europe and the Americas. St. Hilarion Calendar of Saints for the year of our Lord 2004. St. Hilarion Press (Austin, TX). p. 26.
 April 4. Latin Saints of the Orthodox Patriarchate of Rome.
 The Roman Martyrology. Transl. by the Archbishop of Baltimore. Last Edition, According to the Copy Printed at Rome in 1914. Revised Edition, with the Imprimatur of His Eminence Cardinal Gibbons. Baltimore: John Murphy Company, 1916. p. 96.
 Rev. Richard Stanton. A Menology of England and Wales, or, Brief Memorials of the Ancient British and English Saints Arranged According to the Calendar, Together with the Martyrs of the 16th and 17th Centuries. London: Burns & Oates, 1892. p. 144.
Greek Sources
 Great Synaxaristes:  4 Απριλίου. Μεγασ Συναξαριστησ.
  Συναξαριστής. 4 Απριλίου. ecclesia.gr. (H Εκκλησια Τησ Ελλαδοσ). 
Russian Sources
  17 апреля (4 апреля). Православная Энциклопедия под редакцией Патриарха Московского и всея Руси Кирилла (электронная версия). (Orthodox Encyclopedia - Pravenc.ru).
  4 апреля (ст.ст.) 17 апреля 2013 (нов. ст.) . Русская Православная Церковь Отдел внешних церковных связей.

April in the Eastern Orthodox calendar